A micron is a non-SI name for micrometre (μm).

Micron may also refer to:

Science
 Micrometre of mercury, a unit of pressure equal to one thousandth of a millimeter of mercury.
 Micron (wool), the measurement used to express the diameter of a wool fibre
 Micron (journal), a scientific microscopy journal
 Micron (magazine), an Italian science and technology magazine

Technology
 Alesis Micron, an analog-modelling synthesizer made by Alesis Studio Electronics
 Micron Technology, an American semiconductor manufacturer

Other
 Breve, a diacritic used to indicate a short vowel
 Micron, a unit used to measure time or distance in Battlestar Galactica
 Micron, a character in the animated series Batman Beyond
Wright Micron, a human-powered aircraft built by Peter Wright